Verkhnemursalyayevo (Ürge Mörsäläy) is a rural locality (a village) in Kugarchinsky Selsoviet, Kugarchinsky District, Bashkortostan, Russia. The population was 126 as of 2010. There is 1 street.

Geography 
Verkhnemursalyayevo is located 41 km south of Mrakovo (the district's administrative centre) by road. Verkhnesyuryubayevo is the nearest rural locality.

References 

Rural localities in Kugarchinsky District